No Hope, No Future is the second album by English indie rock band Good Shoes. It was released in January 2010.

Reception
No Hope, No Future received "mixed or average reviews" according to review aggregator Metacritic based on 11 reviews. 

Pitchfork Marc Hogan stated it was "A darker album, a slightly clumsier album, but an album with a strong unifying themes and a few songs worth stepping away from the bar for." Heather Phares from AllMusic said "No Hope, No Future doesn't always play to the band's proven strengths, but it shows that Good Shoes are a thoroughly independent, even contrary band that's unafraid of change, even when it's difficult" Kelly Murray called of NME opined "Good Shoes offer little to get flustered over with this sometimes dire, but mostly mediocre second album" calling the album's title "prophetic".

Track listing

Personnel
Rhys Jones – vocals, guitar
Steve Leach – guitar
Will Church – bass guitar
Tom Jones – drums

References

2010 albums
Good Shoes albums